Pytomnyk is a rural settlement in Kharkiv Raion of Kharkiv Oblast of eastern Ukraine, at about  north by east from the centre of Kharkiv city. It belongs to Derhachi urban hromada, one of the hromadas of Ukraine.

The settlement came under attack by Russian forces in 2022, during the Russian invasion of Ukraine.

References

Populated places in Kharkiv Oblast
Populated places established in 1650